St. Stephen's Episcopal School is a private coeducational preparatory boarding and day school in Austin, Texas. Enrollment for the 2019-20 academic year is approximately 694, with 487 students in grades 9–12 and 207 in grades 6–8. Of the school's 694 students, 523 are day students and 171 are boarding students. The school's campus overlooks Lake Austin and is spread across  of the Texas Hill Country. The school is accredited by The Association of Boarding Schools, Independent Schools Association of the Southwest, the Southwestern Association of Independent Schools, the National Association of Episcopal Schools, the National Association of Independent Schools, National Association for College Admission Counseling, and the Association of College Counselors in Independent Schools.

History
Bishop John E. Hines of the Episcopal Diocese of Texas founded St. Stephen's Episcopal School in 1950. He was once quoted as saying that it was the duty of Christians "to live on the bleeding edge of the human dilemma". Hines believed girls should have equal access to education, and St. Stephen's was the first Episcopalian co-educational boarding school in the United States. The school also played a part in the 20th-century Civil Rights Movement as the first integrated boarding school in the South.

Governance
St. Stephen's has a board of trustees, including alumni and parents of former students. Day-to-day operations of the school are overseen by a head of school, who is appointed by the board of trustees with the consent of the Bishop of the Episcopal  Diocese of Texas. The current headmaster, Christopher L. Gunnin, was appointed in 2016.

Currently there is a boarding program, with students supervised by a team of roughly 38 full-time staff, as well as  proctors (junior and senior students selected by staff to serve as mentors).

Religion
All faiths are welcomed, encouraged, accepted and celebrated at St. Stephen's Episcopal School. Chapel services are held in the early noons, in the form of a traditional Episcopalian worship service, sometimes featuring guest speakers and announcements. A weekly Sunday morning church service takes place during the school year, and boarding students are required to attend.

Notable alumni
Terrence Malick (1961) - Film director, screenwriter and producer
Blake Mycoskie (1995) - Founder of Toms Shoes
Ross Ohlendorf (2001) - Major League Baseball pitcher 
Jarrett Allen (2016) - Basketball player for the NBA's Cleveland Cavaliers; played for University of Texas
Mikaila Ulmer (2022) - Lemonade company child CEO
Cecile Richards (1976) - Past President of Planned Parenthood and Planned Parenthood Action Fund

References

External links

Educational institutions established in 1950
1950 establishments in Texas
Private boarding schools in Texas
Private high schools in Texas
Private middle schools in Texas
High schools in Austin, Texas
Episcopal schools in the United States
Education in Austin, Texas
Education in Travis County, Texas
Independent Schools Association of the Southwest
Co-educational boarding schools